Niederer is a German surname.

This surname is shared by the following people:

 Armin Niederer (born 1960), Swiss entrepreneur and former ice hockey player
 Caro Niederer (born 1963), Swiss artist
 Christina Niederer (born 1996), Swiss figure skater and dancer with Russian roots
 Daniela Niederer (better known by her stage name Nora En Pure), South African-Swiss DJ and deep house producer
 Edith Louisa Niederer (1890–1973), New Zealand farmer and community leader
 Marcel Niederer (born 1960), Swiss entrepreneur and former ice hockey player
 Sue Niederer, American political activist

German-language surnames